Dennis Murphy was a Democratic member of the Wisconsin State Senate during the 1849 and 1850 sessions. He represented the 7th District. He was postmaster of Benton, Wisconsin.

References

External links
The Political Graveyard

People from Benton, Wisconsin
Wisconsin postmasters
Democratic Party Wisconsin state senators
Year of birth missing
Year of death missing